Kahiin To Hoga is an Indian soap opera which aired on Star Plus between September 2003 and February 2007. The show was created by Ekta Kapoor of Balaji Telefilms and starred Aamna Sharif, Rajeev Khandelwal and Gurpreet Singh. The show is based on the 1813 novel Pride and Prejudice by Jane Austen.

Plot Summary

Kashish, Mahek, Mouli, Kanan and Charu are five Sinha sisters living in Shimla. Their father, Prof. Sinha, is an idealistic college teacher. One day, Kashish accidentally hits a car belonging to Sujal Garewal, a rich, young businessman. Later, she goes for a job interview to his office. She assumes that she will not get the job, but Sujal hires her. Sujal works for a business enterprise started by his father, Chetan Garewal, in partnership with close friend/brother-figure Lalit Raheja. The Raheja and Garewal families live in the same house. Sujal's best friend is Lalit's son, Piyush. Sujal has a spoilt and arrogant younger brother, Rishi, who flirts with both Mouli and Mahek. Piyush's younger brother, Varun, secretly loves Mahek.

Kashish and Sujal eventually fall in love with each other as they grow even closer since seeing each other daily at work.  She writes a love letter to him and leaves it on his desk. Rishi, who dislikes Kashish, sees the letter and deliberately puts Piyush's name on it. When Piyush sees the letter, he thinks that Kashish likes him and begins to feel the same way for her. Lalit and Prof. Sinha decide to get Piyush and Kashish married. Meanwhile, Sujal and Kashish verbally declare their love to each other. Kashish assumes she is about to get engaged to Sujal. On the day of the engagement Kashish is shocked to see Piyush as her fiancé. But she decides to stay quiet to prevent humiliation of her family. However, Sujal sees the letter with Piyush's name on it and thinks that Kashish is cheating on him. He cuts all ties with her and is heartbroken.

Meanwhile, Mahek becomes pregnant as a result of her relationship with Rishi, but he flatly denies that he is responsible. The Sinha family is embarrassed. Sujal, who blindly trusts Rishi, takes his side. Prof. Sinha throws Mahek out of the house because of her relationship and pregnancy with Rishi and Varun takes care of her. But Mahek is unaware of his love for her. Piyush stands by Kashish and her family. Seeing this, Kashish asks Piyush to marry her. On the day of the wedding, Sujal learns how Kashish's letter to him had reached Piyush. He realizes his mistake. He goes to Kashish, apologizes and asks her to return to him. However, Kashish chooses to marry Piyush and they get married.

Soon, Rishi grows envious of Varun and Mahek's relationship and does not want Varun bringing up his child. As time passes by, Kashish begins to fulfill the duties of a Wife towards Piyush. Sujal is falsely accused by Sanya, upon Archie's prompting as the person trying to cause a rift between Piyush and Kashish. Kashish and Piyush refuse to believe Sujal and with Sujal being misunderstood by everyone, he decides to move out of the Garewal and Raheja house. He vows to ruin Piyush and Kashish. This is the beginning of a rift between Sujal and Kashish, on the one hand, and Sujal and Piyush, on the other. He meets his childhood friend Archie, who is infatuated with him. Her father offers to give Sujal his entire business in return for marrying Archie. Sujal strategically gains market leadership through his business, whilst bringing losses to Kashish, Piyush and the Raheja/Garewal family. This deeps the bitterness and rivalry between Kashish and Sujal, as Kashish roots for Piyush. Kashish learns that she is expecting Piyush's child and the couple are overjoyed. Therefore, Sujal decides not to interfere in Kashish's and Piyush's lives any more. However, tragedy strikes as Piyush dies in a car accident. Sujal is shattered by his friend's death and begins to regret his past actions. Kashish goes into depression on Piyush's death.

Akshat Shergill, an old friend of the Sinha family, enters the scene. His entry is followed by the arrival of his mother Reva and elder brother, Swayam. Akshat starts working in the R&G company and becomes a good friend and ally of Sujal, whilst he's also a good friend to Kashish. He learns of Kashish and Sujal's past and of Sujal's unconditional love for Kashish and hopes to bring them together to give Kashish a new life. Akshat and Charu soon fall in love with each other. Mahek gives birth to a son.  Varun soon confesses his love for her and proposes but she refuses as she doesn't want to be in a relationship again. But later accepts as she realises is willing to sacrifice everything for her and her son who she names Roshan. Sujal arranges their marriage much to Rishi's dismay. As Mahek begins to live in the Raheja/Garewal household, Rishi flirts with her and grows close to their son. He finds out that he has real feelings for Mahek and tries to separate Mahek and Varun but is thwarted each time. Mouli falls in love with Rishi again and leaves her house to live with him. Prof. Sinha cuts ties with her for good. After some time, it is revealed that Piyush's death was not an accident. The car crash was deliberately caused. 

Kashish begins to suspect Sujal of killing her husband and starts believing the false evidences planted against Sujal. With Kashish failing to realize this as a ploy against Sujal and her, Kashish begins deeply hating Sujal and wants to seek revenge and get even with Sujal. To punish him, Kashish decides to marry Sujal and live close to him to get access to his home and business and to destroy him. Kashish and Sujal do not consummate their marriage after Kashish asks Sujal to give her time. Unaware of Kashish's hatred for him and of Kashish's intentions of not taking this Marriage seriously, Sujal respects her decision and assures her to take as much time as she needs. Kashish begins to lay many obstacles in Sujal's path personally and professionally. However, despite trying to hurt Sujal and as time passes by, she finds herself getting attracted towards Sujal again and is drawn to him. The more Kashish tries to shake her revived attraction for Sujal, the stronger she finds herself being pulled towards him. Much to Kashish's dismay, she finds herself fantasizing about Sujal and wanting to get close to him, whilst being torn apart by her commitment to hating Sujal and to seek revenge. To punish herself for thinking that way, Kashish causes a major accident to happen to Sujal and herself as a final showdown where she is ready to lose her life, if it also claims Sujal's life, thus exacting her revenge on Sujal. She fails the breaks of the car that Sujal and her travel in and refuses to jump out of the vehicle to save herself, despite Sujal's multiple pleas and prompting. 

Sujal jumps out of the car in the nick of time, whilst the car falls down a steep cliff and erupts into flames immediately. Sujal is devastated and believes he has lost Kashish, but finds relief upon he sees her lying unconscious yet deeply wounded close to the bottom of the cliff. Eventually a badly wounded Sujal, saves the life of a seriously wounded and unconscious Kashish. In the process of Sujal saving Kashish's life, Sujal ends up with deep abrasive wounds himself. Kashish and Sujal survive the deadly ordeal. When recovering from the accident, Kashish stumbles upon Sujal's diary and learns of Sujal's intense love for her and learns from everyone around her of Sujal's valiant efforts to save her life, while risking his. Kashish feels guilty, is moved and breaks down upon seeing Sujal's wounds. When Kashish sees Sujal nursing to his deep wounds, she offers to aid him. Upon seeing Sujal's wounds that he obtained whilst saving her life, Kashish breaks down in a perplexed Sujal's arms. Kashish and Sujal consummate their Marriage. Kashish later regrets her letting her emotions and love for Sujal come in the way of her extracting her vengeance from him. 

As Kashish's love for Sujal heightens, in order to stop herself from losing track again, she expedites framing Sujal in the SG Enterprises' case and gets him arrested on New Year's Eve. Kashish is secretely heartbroken over Sujal's arrest. Rishi exposes Kashish as the culprit behind Sujal's arrest, to which Kashish confesses to her part. While the entire Raheja and Garewal house is shaken by Kashish's betrayal and of her false understanding of Sujal as Piyush's killer, Akshat, Rishi and Kashish's sister take Sujal's side and are determined to prove him innocent. Kashish has a heated argument with Sujal in jail, wherein she reveals to Sujal, her motive behind marrying him. Sujal challenges Kashish to accept that she still loves him and has always only loved him. Kashish is shaken.

Eventually, Kashish begins learning of clues that point towards Sujal's innocence and is startled. To find out the truth, Kashish goes to the accident spot of Piyush's demise and learn from a local, the first hand account of how things played out on the day of Piyush's death and Sujal's innumerous efforts to save Piyush's life. Kashish having finally learnt the truth breaks down and rushes to the courthouse to interrupt the proceedings and prevent Sujal from getting sentenced. Sujal however to Kashish's shock, confesses to being guilty in the SG Enterprises' case.

Kashish learns from Akshat that Sujal always knew of Kashish's intentions to destroy him and yet surrendered himself to the authorities so that, she is not jailed on account of falsely framing Sujal. Learning this, Kashish is deeply ashamed of herself and of what she put Sujal through. Kashish repents and bitterly weeps before Sujal, who instantly forgives her. Kashish and Sujal reconcile in the Jail. 

Eventually, Kashish teams up with Akshat and Rishi to free Sujal and Sujal wins the case. With everything back to normal, Sujal and Kashish reunite and rekindle their love and passion for each other. Kashish is now deeply in love with Sujal again and is a loyal ally and partner. Vasu who believes that Kashish reconciled with Sujal for the money and to live a wealthy life, gets Sujal arrested again but in the charge of Piyush's murder this time. Kashish is heartbroken and so is the entire family except Vasu. Kashish vows to prove Sujal innocent and to set him free, to live a life with him again.

Eventually, Archie turns out to be Piyush's murderer. Archie was jealous of Sujal's love for Kashish and wanted to get rid of her, but Piyush died in the car crash meant for his wife. With the misunderstandings out of the way, the love between Sujal and Kashish is rekindled. It is revealed that Reva is Chetan's first wife and Swayam and Akshat are Sujal's half-brothers. Swayam is an evil person who starts creating problems for Sujal and his family. Mouli finds out about Rishi's flirtatious behavior behind her back and wants to return home but her father refuses. But the sisters forgive her. She begins to live in another house alone.

On his way to meet Kashish, Sujal has an altercation with some criminals, falls into a river and is presumed dead.(With this, the exit of the popular Male Actor Rajeev Khandelwal takes place) Kashish and the family are heartbroken and Kashish yearns for Sujal. Hoping against hope, Kashish yearns that he is alive somewhere and has survived the ordeal and would return to her, though everyone considers him dead. Sujal survives but loses his memory and undergoes reconstructive surgery. He gets a new face  and is known by the name Tushar.(played by Gurpreet Singh) He is taken care by Dr Archita. Tushar soon meets and falls in love with Kashish, not knowing that she is his wife. Kashish feels a sense of familiarity with Thushar and is intrigued by him, but suppresses any feelings because of her love for her ex-husband Sujal. Charu soon grows attracted to Tushar and eventually falls for him after misunderstanding Kashish and Akshat to be getting married. Kashish has Tushar marry Charu, and then finds out that he is Sujal. Kashish is heartbroken upon realizing that Thushar is her very own Sujal whom she has loved and missed as much. But given the circumstances, Kashish tells him to stay with his new wife and her sister Charu, seeing how Charu is happy with him and from the guilt of being the reason for Akshat and Charu's separation. 

Sujal is defiant and resists Kashish in her pleas. However, Sujal eventually tries to fulfil the duties of a Husband to Charu, for Kashish's sake. Sujal soon separates from Charu when he discovers that she had played tricks to get him. He tries to get close to Kashish once again but Charu is pregnant and ill and has to be in a wheelchair after landing in an accident. Kashish finds out she is too pregnant by Sujal after a one-night stand and immediately regrets it but Sujal is happy. It is then revealed that Charu was faking her illness in order for Sujal to grow closer to her but the truth comes out and everyone shuns her. Kashish and Sujal then reunite. During a party Charu commits suicide leaving Akshat in despair but it is rumored that she was mysteriously killed. Mouli falls for and marries Siddharth, the brother-in-law  of a rich man named Shabbir Ahluwalia.

Sujal looks forward to a new life with Kashish. But she learns that the secret of her sister's death can be found within the Ahluwalia family. So, Kashish marries Shabbir Ahluwalia in order to find Charu's killer. Disappointed and heart broken, Sujal wants revenge from Kashish. So he pretends to romance Gayatri, Mr. Ahluwalia's daughter, who works with him. Kashish becomes jealous; although she knows that Sujal is only seeking revenge from her. Mr. Ahluwalia learns about the murderer but is soon killed; Kashish is sent to jail, and Kashish's father is killed. Varun and Mahek get divorced because of mutual differences. She also learns she is pregnant with his child. Mahek marries Rishi to ensure she obtains custody of her Roshan, whilst, Varun falls for and marries Shivangi, Mr Ahluwalia's youngest daughter. Soon, Rishi turns over a new leaf and begins to care for Mahek. Kashish learns that Siddharth murdered Charu, Mr. Ahluwalia, and Prof. Sinha.

Kashish, Rishi and Mahek move to a new town. There, they meet Abhishek Chauhan, a navy officer and a look-alike of Piyush (who is later found to be his identical twin). Abhishek is a widower with a young daughter, Sneha. Kashish, Mahek and Rishi begin living happily until Swayam returns. Soon, Rishi dies while saving Sujal which makes Sujal and Mahek heartbroken. Swayam threatens Kashish that he will frame Sujal for Rishi's murder. To save Sujal, Kashish has to leave him forever. So, she agrees to marry Abhishek. But Abhishek realizes that she is making a sacrifice. He has Sujal and Kashish marry each other. Swayam's evil plans to frame Sujal and harm the Garewals fail. He is killed by Mahek after he stole her child and for killing Rishi.

Five years later, Kashish and Sujal are seen living happily together. Mouli is also there. Abhishek and Mahek, too, are married and living with their children.

Cast

 Aamna Sharif as Kashish Sinha Garewal – Prof. Sinha's eldest daughter; Mahek, Mauli, Kanan and Charu's sister; Piyush's widow; Sujal's wife
 Rajeev Khandelwal / Gurpreet Singh as Sujal Garewal – Veena and Chetan's elder son; Rishi's brother; Swayam and Akshat's half-brother; Kashish's first love and Kashish's husband
 Rohit Bakshi as 
 Piyush Raheja – Lalit and Vasundhra's eldest son; Abhishek, Varun, Sanjana and Aman's brother; Kashish's first husband (Dead)
 Abhishek Raheja – Lalit and Vasundhra's second son; Piyush, Varun, Sanjana and Aman's brother; Mahek's husband; Sneha's father
 Vikas Sethi as Swayam Shergill – Chetan and Reva's elder son; Akshat's brother; Sujal and Rishi's half-brother (Dead)
 Shabir Ahluwalia as Rishi Garewal – Veena and Chetan's younger son; Sujal's brother; Swayam and Akshat's half-brother; Sanjana's ex-husband; Mahek's late husband; Roshan's foster father (Dead)
 Chaitanya Choudhry as Akshat Shergill – Chetan and Reva's younger son; Swayam's brother; Sujal and Rishi's half-brother; Kashish's childhood friend
 Poonam Joshi / Vaani Sharma as Mahek Sinha Raheja – Prof. Sinha's second daughter; Kashish, Mauli, Kanan and Charu's sister; Varun's ex-wife; Rishi's widow; Abhishek's wife; Roshan's mother
 Mitra Joshi / Surveen Chawla as Charu Sinha – Prof. Sinha's youngest daughter; Kashish, Mahek, Mauli and Kanan's sister; Akshat's fiancée (Dead)
 Ashlesha Sawant / Preeti Puri / Ekta Saraiya as Mauli Sinha – Prof. Sinha's third daughter; Kashish, Mahek, Kanan and Charu's sister; Siddharth's ex-wife
 Kusumit Sana / Kanika Kohli / Keerti Gaekwad Kelkar as Kanan Sinha – Prof. Sinha's fourth daughter; Kashish, Mehak, Mauli and Charu's sister
 Amar Talwar / Chetan Pandit / Amar Talwar as Prof. Sinha – Kashish, Mehak, Mauli, Kanan and Charu's father (Dead)
 Madhavi Gogate as Veena Chetan Garewal – Chetan's second wife; Sujal and Rishi's mother
 Deepak Parashar as Chetan Garewal – Lalit's best friend; Reva's ex-husband; Veena's husband; Swayam, Akshat, Sujal and Rishi's father
 Eijaz Khan / Manish Raisinghan as Varun Raheja – Lalit and Vasundhara's third son; Piyush, Abhishek, Sanjana and Aman's brother; Mahek's ex-husband; Shivangi's husband; Roshan's father
 Amit Singh Thakur as Lalit Raheja – Chetan's best friend; Piyush, Abhishek, Sanjana, Varun and Aman's father
 Madhuri Bhatia as Vasundhara Raheja – Lalit's wife; Piyush, Abhishek, Sanjana, Varun and Aman's mother
 Dimple Hirji as Sanjana Raheja – Lalit and Vasundhra's daughter; Piyush, Abhishek, Varun and Aman's sister; Rishi's ex-wife 
 Bhisham Mansukhani as Aman Raheja – Lalit and Vasundhra's youngest son; Piyush, Abhishek, Sanjana and Varun's brother
 Anju Mahendru as Reva Shergill – Chetan's first wife; Swayam and Akshat's mother
 Neetha Shetty as Dr. Archita – Cousimton Face Surgeon; Tushar's friend
 Ravee Gupta / Urvashi Dholakia as Archie Khanna – Sujal's ex-fiancée
 Tinnu Anand as Shabbir Ahluwalia – Kartik, Gayatri and Shivangi's father (Dead) 
 Aashka Goradia as Gayatri Ahluwalia – Shabbir's elder daughter; Kartik and Shivangi's sister; Sujal's ex-fiancée
 Anokhi Anand as Shivangi Ahluwali Raheja – Shabbir's younger daughter; Gayatri and Kartik's sister; Varun's second wife 
 Anas Rashid as Kartik Ahluwalia / Suraj - Shabbir's son; Gayatri and Shivangi's brother
 Mrinal Deshraj as Shipra Arora – Shabbir's sister-in-law 
 Siddharth Vasudev as Siddharth Arora – Shabbir's brother-in-law; Mauli's ex-husband; Shabbir, Charu and Prof. Sinha's murderer
 Rudra Soni / Azaan Ali Khan as Roshan Raheja – Mehak and Varun's son; Rishi and Abhishek's foster son
 Hiten Tejwani as Pratham – Sujal's friend
 Amita Chandekar as Anu – Pratham's wife
 Nikhil Arya as Rahul Singhania
 Jennifer Winget as Svetlana
 Parul Chauhan as Receptionist
 Panchi Bora as Prachi Shah
 Tina Parekh
 Sonia Kapoor as Ritika
 Rocky Verma as Contract Killer
 Shweta Tiwari as Prerna

Development
The series was titled as Kashish but was renamed to Kahiin To Hoga before premiere.

Reception 

Kahiin to Hoga stands to be the most popular fictional love story on Indian Television to have been aired, with fans popularly referring to it as the "Greatest of All Times". With Sujal and Kashish's chemistry becoming the epitome of passionate romance, lead actors Rajeev Khandelwal and Aamna Sharif were felicitated with prestigious awards from Indian Television Awards (ITA), Indian Television Academy Awards (ITAA) and Star Parivaar Awards (SPA), for the Best Popular Indian Television Jodi. Khandelwal and Sharif popularized and made iconic, the now popular trend of rain dances and segments in Indian Television. Khandelwal and Sharif were fondly known as the 'Rain Jodi' or 'Rain Couple' of Indian Television, famous for making iconic, their rain romance scenes as Sujal and Kashish.

Lead Actor Rajeev Khandelwal grew to become a rage among the audience, for his portrayal of Sujal Garewal and garnered massive popularity in India and abroad. The character of Sujal Garewal played by Rajeev Khandelwal set the bar for Male Actors on Indian Television who played the role of an Angry Young Man or that of a Scorned Lover. Sujal was the 'gold standard', the 'reference point' and the 'ultimate standard' as said by television personality Harshad Chopra. Rajeev Khandelwal's screen presence as Sujal Garewal is still known to be untouchable. Khandelwal is known to enjoy the popularity garnered as Sujal Garewal to this day.

Television Czarina Ekta Kapoor in an Interview, confessed of Sujal (played by Rajeev Khandelwal), being the only Male Character amongst all her shows to made a fangirl out of herself. As said in an interview, Kapoor confessed 'I though Sujal, played by Rajeev Khandelwal was a fantastic brooding young Man and I would often find myself swaying towards this character and found myself attached to this character'.

Sharif beheld the prestige of a glamorous icon on Indian Television for her portrayal of Kashish Garewal and was complimented by her Male co-star Rajeev Khandewal. Together Khandewal and Sharif ruled Television screens as the most popular fictional couple of the decade and still enjoy fame for their onscreen chemistry and portrayal of Sujal and Kashish Garewal.

Owing to their popularity as a couple, Khandelwal and Sharif were offered to play the lead role in Pakistani Television Soap 'Sun Leynna' which was shot in Malaysia and Singapore. The couple was also roped in play the leads for the show 'Hum Do Humarein Do' which didn't premiere on TV. Rajeev.K and Aamna.S made several appearances on popular shows like Deal Ya No Deal, Honge Juda na Hum and have hosted several segments of popular Indian entertainment news show called 'Saas Bahu Saadish', with the most famous segment being the Valentines Day segment that the couple hosted. The couple also featured as brand ambasaddors for 'Nescafe' in 2005, featuring in Nescafe's prime time Ads together as Sujal and Kashish.

In 2013 Khandelwal was asked to make an appearance on Sharif's TV show 'Honge Juda Na Hum', in order to increase the ratings of the show. The show topped the TRP charts on Sony on the day Khandelwal made an appearance and the duo danced to the segment of their popular theme song from Kahiin to Hoga 'Thoda Sa Pyaar Hua Hai'.

Kahiin to Hoga hit jackpot for Starplus in the 11PM slot and recorded multiple hit variations of the famous song 'Thoda Sa Pyaar Hua Hai' on the lead couple Sujal and Kashish, sung by Babul Supriyo and Priya Bhattacharya. The most popular versions are streamed on YouTube following requests from fans and have garnered a lot of views. Kahiin to Hoga is known to have the most number of fan made videos on popular video streaming platform 'YouTube', on the lead couple Sujal and Kashish played by Rajeev Khandelwal and Aamna Sharif.

Ratings

Kahiin started with a rating of 5 TVR in the premiere week at number 31 of most watched Hindi television series but gradually increased and entered top 10 programs.

Kahiin to hoga became one of the most popular Indian television programs by achieved the milestone of getting TVR of 10.77 in second week of 2005, despite aired at 11:00 pm (IST) slot. From January to November 2004, it averaged 8.8 TVR being the fourth most watched Hindi GEC. In December 2004, it averaged 9.35 TVR. In second week of 2005, it garnered 14.54, 10.36 and 10.71 TVR in Mumbai, Delhi and Kolkata areas.

After the exit of Rajeev Khandelwal in early 2005, the ratings decreased. However, with the entry of Tinnu Anand, it started to increase again and increased even more with his character's death which got 7.18 TVR in August 2006 being the fourth most watched Hindi show.

The show went off air despite being in top 10 show as makers of the show felt that story became stretching after the exit of Rajeev Khandelwal who was replaced by Gurpreet Singh. The show to this date is remembered as a classic during Golden Period of Indian television fiction.

Critics
Mid-Day stated that the series was popular mainly because of the lead characters Kashish and Sujal's crackling chemistry.

Awards and nominations

Soundtrack

References

External links
 
 Official Website on STAR Plus
 Official Website on STAR Utsav

Balaji Telefilms television series
StarPlus original programming
Indian romance television series
Indian drama television series
Indian television soap operas
2003 Indian television series debuts
2007 Indian television series endings
Television shows set in Shimla
Television shows based on British novels
Television series based on Pride and Prejudice